The Luzon Zambales forest mouse (Apomys zambalensis) is a forest mouse endemic to Zambales in Luzon, Philippines.

References

Apomys
Rodents of the Philippines
Mammals described in 2011
Endemic fauna of the Philippines